Alan Graham may refer to:

Alan R. Graham (born 1942), Canadian politician
Alan Graham (British politician) (1896–1964), British Conservative politician

See also
Alan Grahame (1954–2021), English former speedway rider